Barbara "Bärbel" Mayer (born 14 March 1935) is a German sprinter. She competed in the women's 4 × 100 metres relay at the 1956 Summer Olympics.

References

External links
 

1935 births
Living people
Athletes (track and field) at the 1956 Summer Olympics
German female sprinters
Olympic athletes of the United Team of Germany
Place of birth missing (living people)
Olympic female sprinters